Social Media Exchange (SMEX) is a Lebanese non-governmental organization with a mission to advocate for digital rights in the Arab world. It is based in Beirut. Its executive director is Mohamad Najem.

References 

Human rights organisations based in Lebanon